The 2016 Guam Democratic presidential caucuses took place on May 7 in the U.S. territory of Guam as one of the Democratic Party's primaries ahead of the 2016 presidential election.

No other primary election was scheduled for this day. The Republican Party's Guam caucus took place on March 12, 2016.

Results

See also 
 2016 United States presidential straw poll in Guam
 2016 United States presidential election
 2016 Guam Republican presidential caucuses

External links 
 Green papers for 2016 primaries, caucuses, and conventions

Guam
Democratic caucus
2016